Tova Hartman (born 1957) is the Dean of Humanities at the Ono Academic College.

Biography
Tova Hartman is the daughter of Rabbi Prof. David Hartman. She was married to Moshe Halbertal, and they have three daughters.
She is a founder of Kehillat Shira Hadasha, a congregation organized to increase women's participation and leadership within traditional Jewish prayer and halakha.

Academic career
Tova Hartman was a professor of Gender Studies and Education at Bar Ilan University, specializing in gender and religion, and gender and psychology.

Literary career
She is the author of a book on Jewish and Catholic mothers, titled Appropriately Subversive, as well as a book on the crossroads of Jewish Tradition and modern feminism, titled Feminism Encounters Traditional Judaism, which won the National Jewish Book Award for Women's Studies in 2007. Hartman is the author of Are You Not a Man Of God? Devotion, Betrayal and Social Criticism in Jewish Tradition. Her book “Men with Broken Hearts” published in 2022, offers insight into the lives of men dealing with separation from their partners.

Published works 
 Appropriately Subversive: Modern Mothers in Traditional Religions, Harvard University Press, 2003, 
Hartman, T. and Marmon, M., "Lived Regulations, Systemic Attributions Menstrual Separation and Ritual Immersion in the Experience of Orthodox Jewish Women." Gender & Society 18:3, pp. 389–408 (2004)

See also
 Feminist Jewish ethics
 Hebrew University of Jerusalem
 Jewish feminism
 Jewish Orthodox Feminist Alliance
 Women in Judaism

References

External links
 Hebrew University School of Education
 Tova Hartman and Tamar Miller, "Our Tradition, Ourselves", JOFA Bulletin, Winter 2001
 Jessica Ravitz, "An Orthodox Feminist Revolutionary", Moment, January/February 2009.
"Orthodox Group Fetes Traditional Roles", Forward, May 11, 2001

Living people
Israeli Jews
Orthodox Jewish feminists
Academic staff of Bar-Ilan University
1957 births
Jewish ethicists
Academic staff of Ono Academic College